John O'Donnell was a 19th-century Major League Baseball player. He played catcher in one game for the 1884 Philadelphia Keystones of the Union Association. His one game was played on July 16, 1884. He recorded one hit in four at-bats.

Sources

19th-century baseball players
Major League Baseball catchers
Philadelphia Keystones players
Year of death missing
Baseball players from Pennsylvania
Year of birth missing
People from Littlestown, Pennsylvania